General Turner may refer to:

Abraham J. Turner (1970s–2010s), U.S. Army major general
Alfred Edward Turner (1842–1918), British Army major general
Charles W. Turner (attorney) (1846–1907), Adjutant General of Montana
James Turner (soldier) ( (1615–c. 1686), Adjutant-general of the Scottish army
John Wesley Turner (1833–1899), U.S. Army brigadier general and brevet major general
Richard Ernest William Turner (1871–1961), Canadian Army lieutenant general
Thomas R. Turner II (born 1955), U.S. Army lieutenant general
Tomkyns Hilgrove Turner (1764–1843), British Army general
William Turner (British Army officer) (1907–1989), British Army lieutenant general
Yaakov Turner (born 1935), Israeli Air Force brigadier general

See also
Attorney General Turner (disambiguation)